= Philip of Austria =

Philip of Austria may refer to either of two Habsburg kings in Spain, whose family originated in Austria:

- Philip I of Castile (1478–1506), Lord of the Burgundian Netherlands (1482–1506) and jure uxoris King of Castile and León (1506)
- Philip II of Spain (1527–1598), King of Spain (1556–1598), King of Portugal (1580–1598), King of Naples and Sicily (1554–1598), and jure uxoris King of England and Ireland (1554–1558)
